The 2020 WTA Tour was the elite professional tennis circuit organised by the Women's Tennis Association (WTA) for the 2020 tennis season. The 2020 WTA Tour calendar originally comprised the Grand Slam tournaments supervised by the International Tennis Federation (ITF), the WTA Premier tournaments (Premier Mandatory, Premier 5, and regular Premier), the WTA International tournaments, the Fed Cup (organized by the ITF), and the year-end championships (the WTA Tour Championships and the WTA Elite Trophy).

Many tournaments were cancelled or postponed due to the COVID-19 pandemic, including the Tokyo Summer Olympics.

Schedule
This is the complete schedule of events on the 2020 calendar, with player progression documented from the quarterfinals stage.

Key

January

February

March

April – July 
No tournaments were played due to the COVID-19 pandemic, see affected tournaments below.

August

September

October

November

Affected tournaments 
The COVID-19 pandemic affected many tournaments on the WTA Tour. The following tournaments were suspended or postponed.

Statistical information
These tables present the number of singles (S), doubles (D), and mixed doubles (X) titles won by each player and each nation during the season, within all the tournament categories of the 2019 WTA Tour: the Grand Slam tournaments, the year-end championships (the WTA Tour Championships and the WTA Elite Trophy), the WTA Premier tournaments (Premier Mandatory, Premier 5, and regular Premier), and the WTA International tournaments. The players/nations are sorted by:

 total number of titles (a doubles title won by two players representing the same nation counts as only one win for the nation);
 cumulated importance of those titles (one Grand Slam win equalling two Premier Mandatory/Premier 5 wins, one year-end championships win equalling one-and-a-half Premier Mandatory/Premier 5 win, one Premier Mandatory/Premier 5 win equalling two Premier wins, one Premier win equalling two International wins);
 a singles > doubles > mixed doubles hierarchy;
 alphabetical order (by family names for players).

Key

Titles won by player

Titles won by nation

Titles information
The following players won their first main circuit title in singles, doubles, or mixed doubles:
Singles
 Ekaterina Alexandrova – Shenzhen (draw)
 Jennifer Brady – Lexington (draw)
 Patricia Maria Țig – İstanbul (draw)
 Iga Świątek – French Open (draw)
Doubles
 Taylor Townsend – Auckland (draw)
 Arina Rodionova – Hua Hin (draw)
 Laura Ioana Paar – Lyon (draw)
 Julia Wachaczyk – Lyon (draw)

The following players defended a main circuit title in singles, doubles, or mixed doubles:
Singles
 Karolína Plíšková – Brisbane (draw)
 Kiki Bertens – St. Petersburg (draw)
Doubles
 Hsieh Su-wei – Dubai (draw)
 Barbora Strýcová – Dubai (draw)
 Tímea Babos – French Open (draw)
 Kristina Mladenovic – French Open (draw)
Mixed doubles
 Barbora Krejčíková – Australian Open (draw)

Best ranking
The following players achieved their career high ranking in this season inside top 50 (in bold the players who entered the top 10 for the first time).

Singles

Doubles

Points distribution

S = singles players, D = doubles teams, Q = qualification players.
* Assumes undefeated Round Robin match record.

WTA rankings
These are the WTA rankings and yearly WTA Race rankings of the top 20 singles and doubles players at the current date of the 2020 season. Rankings were frozen due to the COVID-19 pandemic from 16 March 2020 up until the resumption of the season on 3 August 2020. The 2020 WTA Finals was then cancelled on 24 July 2020 due to the pandemic, so below are the unofficial WTA Singles and Doubles Race rankings for only 2020 events.

Singles

†Change since previous week's rankings

Number 1 ranking

Doubles

†Change since previous week's rankings

Number 1 ranking

Prize  money leaders

Retirements

Following is a list of notable players (winners of a main tour title, and/or part of the WTA rankings top 100 in singles or doubles, for at least one week; and wheelchair players) who announced their retirement from professional tennis, became inactive (after not playing for more than 52 weeks), or were permanently banned from playing, during the 2020 season: 
 Marjolein Buis (born 11 January 1988 in Nijmegen, Netherlands)
 Estrella Cabeza Candela (born 20 February 1987 in Los Palacios y Villafranca, Spain) turned professional in 2004 and reached a career high ranking of 95 in singles and 176 in doubles. Cabeza Candela also won 13 singles and 16 doubles titles on the ITF Women's Circuit. In 2020, Cabeza Candela announced her retirement on the tour.
 Rika Fujiwara (born 19 September 1981 in Tokyo, Japan) turned professional in 1997 and reached a career high ranking of 84 in singles and 13 in doubles. Fujiwara reached six WTA doubles finals during her career, winning one of them at the Danish Open in 2012. Fujiwara also won 9 singles and 36 doubles titles on the ITF Women's Circuit. Fujiwara's biggest highlight was at the 2002 French Open, where she reached the women's doubles semifinals partnering her compatriot Ai Sugiyama. In March 2020, Fujiwara announced her retirement after 23 years on the tour.
 Julia Görges (born 2 November 1988 in Bad Oldesloe, West Germany) (modern day Germany) turned professional in 2005 and reached a career high ranking of 9 in singles and 12 in doubles. Görges won 7 WTA singles titles in her career, including 2 premier level events and the 2017 WTA Elite Trophy. She scored multiple career top ten wins in her career including back to back wins against the then World no. 1 Caroline Wozniacki during the clay season in 2011. Her best grand slam result was a semifinal at 2018 Wimbledon Championships. Görges announced her retirement via social media on 21 October.
 Jamie Hampton (born 8 January 1990 in Frankfurt, West Germany)  turned professional in 2009 and reached a career high ranking of 24 in singles and 74 in doubles. Hampton reached one WTA singles final during her career, losing to Elena Vesnina at the 2013 Aegon International. She reached the fourth round at the 2013 French Open, and scored wins over multiple current and former top-10 players during her short-lived career, including Petra Kvitová, Agnieszka Radwańska and Caroline Wozniacki. She had not played since January 2014 and, after undergoing six surgery attempts, decided to retire in May.
 Johanna Larsson (born 17 August 1988 in Boden, Sweden) turned professional in 2006 and reached a career high ranking of 45 in singles and 20 in doubles. Larsson won two WTA singles titles during her career, including at her home event in Båstad in 2015, and enjoyed considerable success in doubles, winning 14 titles and reaching the year-end championships final in 2017 alongside Kiki Bertens. Larsson decided to retire in February.
 Ekaterina Makarova (born 7 June 1988 in Moscow, Russian SFSR, Soviet Union) (modern-day Russia) turned professional in 2004 and reached a career high ranking of 8 in singles in 2015 and number 1 in doubles in 2018. A six-time Grand Slam singles quarterfinalist with two semifinal appearances at the 2014 US Open and 2015 Australian Open, Makarova also won three WTA singles titles during her career. She achieved phenomenal success in doubles, with 3 Grand Slam women's doubles titles alongside Elena Vesnina at the 2013 French Open, the 2014 US Open and at Wimbledon in 2017, as well as the mixed doubles title at the 2012 US Open alongside Bruno Soares. She also partnered Vesnina to gold in the women's doubles at the 2016 Olympics, and to the title at the WTA Finals, also in 2016. Makarova announced her retirement at the 2020 St. Petersburg Ladies' Trophy.
 María José Martínez Sánchez (born 12 August 1982 in Murcia, Spain) turned professional in 1998 and reached a career-high ranking of 19 in singles in 2010 and 4 in doubles, also in 2010. Through her career she won a total of 5 WTA titles in singles but focused primarily in doubles later in her career winning a total of 21 titles in that discipline. In doubles she reached the semi finals of Grand Slams 3 times; at the French Open in 2010 and 2012 and at the US Open in 2012. She reached the quarter finals of all slams in doubles. In 2009 she won the Tour Finals with long time doubles partner Nuria Llagostera Vives. In January 2020 she announced her retirement.
 Jessica Moore (born 16 August 1990 in Perth, Australia) turned professional in 2008 and reached a career-high ranking of 132 in singles in 2008 and 55 in doubles in 2019. Moore won two WTA titles in doubles, as well as 4 singles and 31 doubles titles on the ITF Circuit. She also won silver at the 2010 Commonwealth Games in the women's doubles, partnering Olivia Rogowska. Moore announced her retirement at the Australian Open.
 Aleksandrina Naydenova (born 29 February 1992 in Plovdiv, Bulgaria), a former world number 95 in doubles. Was given a lifetime ban from competition by the Tennis Integrity Unit (TIU).
 Romina Oprandi (born 29 March 1986 in Jegenstorf, Switzerland) turned professional in 2005 and reached career-high rankings of 32 in singles in 2013, and 112 in doubles in 2007. Oprandi won one WTA title in doubles, as well as 26 singles and 11 doubles titles on the ITF Circuit. In May 2020 she announced her retirement.
 Pauline Parmentier (born 31 January 1986 in Cucq, France) turned professional in 2000 and reached a career-high ranking of 40 in singles, in July 2008, and 121 in doubles in October 2019. Winner of 4 singles titles on the main tour and a total of 13 ITF titles. Her best result at Grand Slam level came in reaching the fourth round at her home slam the French Open in 2014. She announced in January 2019 that this would be her last year on the tour.
 Teliana Pereira (born 20 July 1988 in Águas Belas, Brazil) turned professional in 2005 and reached a career-high ranking of 43 in singles, in October 2015, and 117 in doubles, in September 2013. Winner of 2 singles titles on the main tour and a 22 ITF titles in single and 10 in doubles. Her best result at Grand Slam level came in reaching the second round at  the French Open in 2014, 2015 and 2016. In September 2020, she announced her retirement.
 Magdaléna Rybáriková (born 4 October 1988 in Piešťany, Slovakia) turned professional in 2005, and reached career-high rankings of 17 in singles in 2018, and 50 in doubles in 2011. Winner of 4 singles titles and 1 doubles title on the main tour (with Janette Husárová), Rybáriková's best result is reaching the singles semifinals at 2017 Wimbledon Championships. At first she has announced the retirement from tennis after the 2020 Fed Cup finals in Budapest, but later she announced her official retirement via social media on 29 October.
 Maria Sharapova (born 19 April 1987 in Nyagan, Russian SFSR, Soviet Union) (modern day Russia) turned professional in 2001 and reached the world No. 1 spot for the first time in 2005. A five-time Grand Slam singles winner (she completed the career Grand Slam in 2012), Sharapova won 36 WTA singles titles and 3 doubles titles during her career. She won also the WTA Finals in 2004 and the Fed Cup in 2008. She also won the silver medal in the women's singles at the 2012 Olympics. Sharapova announced her retirement through social media in 2020.
 Sílvia Soler Espinosa (born 19 November 1987 in Elche, Spain) turned professional in 2003, and reached a career-high ranking of No. 54 in singles in 2012, and No. 39 in doubles in 2014. Soler Espinosa reached two WTA singles finals in her career, and won one doubles title alongside Andreja Klepač at the 2014 Connecticut Open. She was a three-time Grand Slam quarterfinalist in doubles, and also reached the third round on three occasions in singles, twice at the US Open and once at Roland Garros. Soler Espinosa decided to retire in May.
 Anna Tatishvili (born 3 February 1990 in Tbilisi, Georgian SSR, Soviet Union) (modern day Georgia) turned professional in 2005 and reached a career-high ranking of No. 50 in singles and 59 in doubles. She won one WTA doubles title in her career in Linz in 2014 alongside Raluca Olaru, as well as reaching two further doubles finals and winning 11 ITF Circuit singles titles. Her greatest achievement at Grand Slam-level came in reaching the fourth round at the 2012 US Open. Tatishvili decided to retire in March, after battling for several years with a persistent ankle injury.
 Caroline Wozniacki (born 11 July 1990 in Odense, Denmark) joined the circuit in 2005, and reached the world No. 1 spot for the first time in 2010. She would spend a total of 71 weeks as number one which puts her at ninth on the all-time list as of January 2020. Wozniacki won a total of 30 WTA titles in singles and 2 WTA titles in doubles. Wozniacki reached three Grand Slam finals at the US Open in 2009 and 2014 and at the Australian Open 2018 where she won her first and only Grand Slam title, beating Simona Halep. She also won the WTA Finals in Singapore 2017. Wozniacki retired after a third-round defeat by Ons Jabeur at the 2020 Australian Open.

Comebacks
Following are notable players who announced their comebacks after retirements during the 2020 WTA Tour season:
 Kim Clijsters (born 8 June 1983 in Bilzen, Belgium) made her return at the 2020 Dubai Tennis Championships in February where she lost to Garbiñe Muguruza in the first round.
 Bojana Jovanovski Petrović
 Tsvetana Pironkova (born 13 September 1987 in Plovdiv, Bulgaria) earned entry into the 2020 US Open under a protected ranking in which she reached the quarterfinals, losing to Serena Williams. The former world number 31, winner of the 2014 Apia International Sydney, and 2010 Wimbledon Championships semifinalist last played in 2017, recovering from shoulder injuries and a pregnancy.

See also 

2020 ATP Tour
2020 WTA 125K series
2020 ITF Women's Circuit
Women's Tennis Association
International Tennis Federation

References

Notes

External links 
Women's Tennis Association (WTA) official website
International Tennis Federation (ITF) official website

 
WTA Tour seasons
WTA Tour
WTA Tour